The 1996–97 FIBA EuroCup was the thirty-first edition of FIBA's 2nd-tier level European-wide professional club basketball competition. it occurred between September 17, 1996, and April 15, 1997. The competition was won by Real Madrid Teka, who beat Mash Jeans Verona, by a score of 78–64 in the final.

Competition system
 48 teams (national domestic cup champions, plus the best qualified teams from the most important European national domestic leagues), entered a preliminary group stage, divided into eight groups of six teams each, and played a round-robin. The final standings were based on individual wins and defeats. In the case of a tie between two or more teams, after the group stage, the following criteria were used to decide the final classification: 1) number of wins in one-to-one games between the teams; 2) basket average between the teams; 3) general basket average within the group.
 The top four teams from each group qualified for a 1/16 Final Playoff (X-pairings, home and away games), where the winners advanced further to 1/8 Finals, 1/4 Finals, and 1/2 Final.
 The Final was played at a predetermined venue.

Country ranking
For the 1996–1997 FIBA EuroCup, the countries are allocated places according to their place on the FIBA country rankings, which takes into account their performance in European competitions from 1993–94 to 1995–96.

Team allocation 
The labels in the parentheses show how each team qualified for the place of its starting round:

 1st, 2nd, 3rd, 4th, 5th, etc.: League position after eventual Playoffs
 CW: Cup winners
 WC: Wild card

Preliminary group stage

Round of 32

|}

Round of 16

|}

Quarterfinals

|}

Semifinals

|}

Final
April 15, Eleftheria Indoor Hall, Nicosia

|}

Awards

FIBA Saporta Cup Finals MVP 
 Alberto Herreros ( Real Madrid Teka)

See also

 1996–97 FIBA Euroleague
 1996–97 FIBA Korać Cup

External links
 1996–97 FIBA EuroCup @ FIBA Europe.com
 1996–97 FIBA EuroCup at Linguasport

FIBA Saporta Cup
FIBA